Neil Bhatt is an Indian television actor known for portraying Ranveer Singh Vaghela in Roop - Mard Ka Naya Swaroop and DCP Virat Chavan in Ghum Hai Kisikey Pyaar Meiin.

Personal life 
Born on 4 August 1987 to Sunita and Himanshu Bhatt, Bhatt hails from a Gujarati family, bought up in Mumbai. He has a younger sister Shikha. Bhatt studied law but acting and dance have always been his passion. He told Times of India that education is something which will always stand by him in good stead. Bhatt is also trained in gymnastics, capoeira, and he reportedly learnt the art for a flexible body.

In 2020, Bhatt had met actress Aishwarya Sharma on the sets of Ghum Hai Kisikey Pyaar Mein and the couple soon fell in love. They announced their engagement in January 2021 and got married on 30 November 2021 in Ujjain.

Career 
Bhatt starred in Kaboom a dance reality show as a participant where he won the first place. Catapulting to fame through the cult dance show Boogie Woogie, his passion led him to one show after the other. He debuted with Arslaan on Sony Television in the year 2008. He got fame by serials like 12/24 Karol Bagh and Gulaal where he played the character of Abhinav Taneja and Kesar and received praise from the audiences. His performance as Lakshman, the soul of Ram in Ramayan was widely appreciated. The show was immensely popular in Indonesia and hence Bhatt, together with his Ramayan co-stars, was invited to perform in a special stage show and fan meeting tour in Jakarta organised by antv.

He has played many challenging roles, one of them being Zakir in Diya Aur Baati Hum and was last seen in a daily soap playing the lead role in Tum Hi Ho Bandhu Sakha Tumhi as Bhushan Pethawala. He was also seen in episodic series of Zindagi Wins and Pyar Tune Kya Kiya. His debut film Bhanwar is an untold story of a folk puppeteer in modern Gujarat. In 2018, he portrayed the negative role of Ranveer Singh Vaghela in Colors TV's Roop - Mard Ka Naya Swaroop. He is currently portraying the lead role of DCP Virat Chavan in Star Plus's Ghum Hai Kisikey Pyaar Meiin.

In February 2022, he participated in Star Plus's Smart Jodi with his wife Aishwarya Sharma Bhatt.

Filmography

Television

Films

Music videos

References

External links 

1987 births
Living people
Indian male soap opera actors